Marc Saumier (born April 18, 1967) is a Canadian former ice hockey player. He won the Michel Brière Memorial Trophy as the Most Valuable Player in the Quebec Major Junior Hockey League for his outstanding play with the Hull Olympiques during the 1987–88 QMJHL season.

Career statistics

References

External links

1967 births
Living people
Canadian ice hockey centres
Flint Spirits players
Fort Wayne Komets players
Halifax Citadels players
Hull Olympiques players
LaSalle Rapides players
Longueuil Chevaliers players
Muskegon Fury players
Peoria Rivermen (IHL) players
Phoenix Roadrunners (IHL) players
Sherbrooke Canadiens players
Ice hockey people from Gatineau
Ottawa Loggers players
San Diego Barracudas players